Taino is a comune (municipality) in the Province of Varese in the Italian region Lombardy, located about 50 km northwest of Milan and about 20 km southwest of Varese. As of 31 December 2004, it had a population of 3,353 and an area of 7.7 km2.

The municipality of Taino contains the frazione (subdivision) Cheglio (pronounced ).

Taino borders the following municipalities: Angera, Sesto Calende.

Demographic evolution

References

External links
 www.comuneditaino.it/

Cities and towns in Lombardy